Julian Vannerson (1827 – after 1875) was a photographer from Virginia during the American Civil War of the 1860s. 
He is best known for his portrait photographs of Robert E. Lee, taken in March 1864, and of J. E. B. Stuart.

See also
 Photographers of the American Civil War

References

Further reading
Wagner, Margaret E., Gary W. Gallagher, and James M. McPherson. The Library of Congress Civil War Desk Reference. New York: Simon and Schuster, 2009.

Links

American portrait photographers
War photographers
1827 births
Year of death missing
Artists from Virginia
Cultural history of the American Civil War
19th-century American photographers